Matthaea is a genus of plant in family Monimiaceae. Its native range is Malesia. It contains the following accepted species:
 Matthaea chartacea Merr.
 Matthaea heterophylla Quisumb. & Merr.
 Matthaea intermedia Merr.
 Matthaea pubescens Merr. ex Perkins
 Matthaea sancta Blume
 Matthaea vidalii Perkins

References 

Monimiaceae genera
Flora of Malesia
Taxonomy articles created by Polbot